Mabillon is a station on Line 10 of the Paris Metro, located in the heart of the Rive Gauche and the 6th arrondissement.

The station opened on 10 March 1925 as part of the line's extension from Croix-Rouge (a station between Sèvres – Babylone and Mabillon, which was closed during World War II). It was the eastern terminus of the line until its extension to Odéon on 14 April 1926. It is named after the nearby street, Rue Mabillon, which in turn is named after Jean Mabillon (1632–1707), a Benedictine monk and scholar, considered the founder of palaeography and diplomatics, who died nearby.

The station is close to Saint-Germain-des-Prés on Line 4, but there is no free transfer between the two stations.

Station layout

Gallery

References

Bibliography
Roland, Gérard (2003). Stations de métro. D’Abbesses à Wagram. Éditions Bonneton.

Paris Métro stations in the 6th arrondissement of Paris
Railway stations in France opened in 1923